Wild Man Dance is a live album by jazz saxophonist Charles Lloyd, recorded in 2013 and released on the Blue Note label in April 2015.

Reception

AllMusic said the album is "a success on virtually every level." All About Jazz noted that "While plenty of musicians tend to slow down as they get older, the opposite seems to be happening with this septuagenarian", and said it "is every bit as magical as the best of Lloyd's output." The Los Angeles Times stated: "Here the dulcimer-like Hungarian cimbalom and the bowed lyra color the open-ended framework of a six-part suite."

Track listing

 "Flying Over The Odra Valley" - 10:59
 "Gardner" - 8:11
 "Lark" - 13:20
 "River" - 16:07
 "Invitation" - 10:34
 "Wild Man Dance - 15:14

Personnel
 Charles Lloyd - tenor saxophone
 Gerald Clayton - piano
 Joe Sanders - bass
 Gerald Cleaver - drums
 Socratis Sinopoulos - Greek lyra
 Lukács Miklós - cimbalom

References

2015 live albums
Blue Note Records albums
Charles Lloyd (jazz musician) live albums